Alan Douglas Benson Clarke  (21 March 1922 – 10 December 2011) was a British psychologist who specialised in the field of learning disability.

Life
Clarke was born on 21 March 1922.  He grew up in Surrey, where his father was a solicitor. He served in the army during the war and afterwards completed a BSc in Psychology at the University of Reading where he met his future wife Ann Gravely, also a psychologist. He then undertook a PhD at the Institute of Psychiatry in London.

In 1951 Alan and Ann Clarke began working at Manor Hospital, Epsom working with children with learning disabilities.  He then moved to the University of Hull to establish the Department of Psychology.

Work
Clarke is renowned for his work on learning disability. He was President of the British Psychological Society and also editor of the British Journal of Psychology. In addition, he was President of the International Association for the Scientific Study of Intellectual Disability. He was appointed CBE in the 1974 Birthday Honours for "services to the Training Council for Teachers of the Mentally Handicapped."

Books
Clarke A., & Clarke, A. (1958 – 1985). Mental Deficiency: The Changing Outlook.

Awards
 1974: CBE
 1977 – 1978: President, British Psychological Society
 2007: Honorary Fellow, British Psychological Society

References

1922 births
2011 deaths
Developmental psychologists
British psychologists
Presidents of the British Psychological Society
Commanders of the Order of the British Empire
British Army personnel of World War II